Whisky Run or Whiskey Run may refer to:

Whisky Run (Jefferson County, Nebraska), a stream in Nebraska
Whiskey Run (Noble County, Ohio), a stream in Ohio
Whiskey Run (Chartiers Creek tributary), a stream in Allegheny County, Pennsylvania
Whiskey Run Township, Crawford County, Indiana, a civil township in Indiana